is a railway station in the city of Nikkō, Tochigi, Japan, operated by the private railway operator Tobu Railway. The station is numbered "TN-25".

Lines
Tōbu-Nikkō Station is the terminus of the Tōbu Nikkō Line, and is located 94.5 km from the starting point of the line at Tōbu-Dōbutsu-Kōen Station.

Station layout

The station has five terminating platforms, numbered 1 to 2 and 4 to 6.

Adjacent stations

History
Tōbu-Nikkō Station opened on 1 October 1929. The current station building was completed in October 1997.

From 17 March 2012, station numbering was introduced on Tobu lines, with Tōbu-Nikkō Station becoming "TN-25".

Passenger statistics
In fiscal 2019, the station was used by an average of 3104 passengers daily (boarding passengers only).

Surrounding area
 Nikkō Station on the JR East Nikkō Line
 Nikkō Police Station
 Nikkō Fire Station

Bus service

Tobu Nikko Station Bus stop

Route and Highway Buses

Nikko Municipal Bus

Nikko Kinugawa Express
Nikko Kotsu
For Kinugawaonsen Station

Nikko Station Bus stop 
The bus stop is located on Japan National Route 119 between Nikko Station and Tobu-Nikko Station.

Route bus

Highway Bus

See also
 List of railway stations in Japan

References

External links

 Tobu-Nikko Station information (Tobu Railway) 

Stations of Tobu Railway
Railway stations in Tochigi Prefecture
Railway stations in Japan opened in 1929
Tobu Nikko Line
Nikkō, Tochigi